Jean-Baptiste Dumay (10 September 1841, in Le Creusot – 27 April 1926, in Paris) was a French politician. He represented the Federation of the Socialist Workers of France (from 1889 to 1890) and the Revolutionary Socialist Workers' Party (from 1890 to 1893) in the Chamber of Deputies.

References

1841 births
1926 deaths
People from Le Creusot
Politicians from Bourgogne-Franche-Comté
Federation of the Socialist Workers of France politicians
Revolutionary Socialist Workers' Party (France) politicians
Members of the 5th Chamber of Deputies of the French Third Republic